Andrew Yates is a professional rugby league player. as of 2018 Yates plays for the Wakefield Trinity (Wildcats) in the Super League. He previously played for the Leeds Rhinos, who he joined from the Hunslet Hawks. He made his Leeds Rhinos début against the Widnes Vikings on 13 February 2015. Yates made his first team début in 2008's Super League XIII. Yates left St. Helens for Hunslet Hawks at the end of 2010 due to a restricted amount of first team appearances, and not being selected in Royce Simmons' first team squad for 2011.

A serious Achilles injury side-lined him at the start of 2014 season before he tore his bicep muscle in his come back game with Hunslet Hawks midway through 2014 season.

References

External links
Saints Heritage Society profile

1990 births
Living people
English rugby league players
Hunslet R.L.F.C. players
Leeds Rhinos players
Rugby league players from St Helens, Merseyside
Rugby league props
St Helens R.F.C. players
Wakefield Trinity players